John Augustus Otunba Payne (1839 – 1906) was a Nigerian sheriff, administrator and diarist who was a prominent personality in Lagos during the nineteenth century. He was a Chief Registrar of the Supreme Court of Lagos and he also served as a registrar in various colonial departments such as the Police Court, the Chief Magistrate's Court, the Court of Civil and Criminal Justice and the Petty Debt court. He produced an annual West African and Lagos Almanac which published some historical notes. He was also the convener of a forum called the Society for the Propagation of Religious Education.

Life
Payne was born in 1839; his father was from a royal house in Ijebu Ode. He was one of the earliest products of CMS Grammar School, Lagos. He was a close friend of James Johnson and was a layman and warden at Christ Church Cathedral, Lagos. He also counseled the Awujale of Ijebuland to allow Christian missionaries. Through his influence, a Christian preacher was allowed to preach in Ago Iwoye.

Payne was also noted for his writings in his annual almanac. One of his entries includes that of the court appearance of ex-Oba Dosunmu, who had been subpoenaed. Payne was charged with administering the solemn oath through an interpreter.

Death
Payne was murdered in his residence in Lagos by an unknown assailant in 1906. His murder was never solved.

See also 
 List of unsolved murders

References

Saro people
1839 births
1906 murders in Nigeria
1906 deaths
19th-century diarists
19th-century Nigerian lawyers
19th-century Nigerian writers
Almanac compilers
CMS Grammar School, Lagos alumni
History of Lagos
Lawyers from Lagos
Male murder victims
Nigerian Christians
Nigerian diarists
People murdered in Lagos
People from colonial Nigeria
Sheriffs
Unsolved murders in Nigeria
Yoruba legal professionals
Yoruba royalty